Cephalosorus is a genus of flowering plants in the family Asteraceae.

There is only one known species, Cephalosorus carpesioides, endemic to Western Australia.

References

Gnaphalieae
Monotypic Asteraceae genera
Eudicots of Western Australia